is the final studio album of Japanese singer-songwriter Miho Komatsu. It was released on 26 April 2006 under Giza Studio.

Background
The album includes previously 3 released singles, since I just wanna hold you tight till Koi ni nare.

In this album, she covered her self written song Fukigen ni Naru Watashi, which was originally performed by Japanese singer Sayuri Iwata.

Before hiatus, she released one best-of compilation album and essay book.

Charting
The album reached #35 rank first week with 6,663 sold copies. Album charted for 4 weeks and totally sold 10,072 copies. This is the lowest sold studio album in her career.

Track listing

In media
I just wanna hold you tight
for Anime television series MÄR as ending theme
Anata Iro
for Nihon TV movie program Eiga Tengoku Chine★Para as grand opening theme
Koi ni Nare
for Tokyo Broadcasting System Television variety program Tokoro Man Yuuki as ending theme

References

2006 albums
Giza Studio albums
Anime songs
Miho Komatsu songs
Songs written by Miho Komatsu
2006 songs
Being Inc. albums
Japanese-language albums
Albums produced by Daiko Nagato